The Mimbilisan Protected Landscape is a protected landscape area located in the province of Misamis Oriental in Northern Mindanao in the Philippines. It was established in 1936 to protect the watershed forest surrounding the Mimbilisan Falls (also spelled Milisbilisan Falls) in the municipality of Talisayan declared through Proclamation No. 51 by President Manuel Luis Quezon. In 1999 and again, in 2007, the forest reserve was reestablished as a protected landscape under the National Integrated Protected Areas System with the enactment of Proclamation No. 134 and Republic Act No. 9494. It is one of five declared protected areas of the Philippines in Misamis Oriental.

Geography
It lies in the northern foothills of the Mount Balatukan Range, another declared protected area classified as a natural park which forms the backbone of the Misamis Peninsula. Mount Balatukan contains the headwaters of several rivers and streams that drain the surrounding coastal municipalities from Balingasag to Gingoog and empty into the Bohol Sea. The Talisayan River borders the Mimbilisan park to the east and the Mindocdocan River to the west.

References

Protected landscapes of the Philippines
Geography of Misamis Oriental
Protected areas established in 1936
1936 establishments in the Philippines